Katniss Everdeen is a fictional character and the protagonist of The Hunger Games trilogy written by American author Suzanne Collins. Her name comes from a plant with edible tubers called Sagittaria (katniss), from Sagittarius the Archer, whose name means He that throws arrows in Latin. She is portrayed by Jennifer Lawrence in the film adaptations The Hunger Games, The Hunger Games: Catching Fire, The Hunger Games: Mockingjay – Part 1, and The Hunger Games: Mockingjay – Part 2.

Katniss and her family come from District 12, a coal-mining district that is the poorest, least populated, and smallest district in the dystopian fictional autocratic nation of Panem, ruled by the Capitol. In the course of the first book, The Hunger Games, Katniss competes in the Hunger Games after she is allowed to volunteer in place of her little sister, Primrose "Prim" Everdeen. While in the arena, Katniss forms an alliance with Rue, the young female tribute from District 11, as she reminds Katniss of her sister. After Rue is killed by a Career Tribute named Marvel, Katniss sings her a lullaby and covers her body in flowers. Later, District 11 shows solidarity with Katniss over Rue’s death and gifts her bread shaped like a moon and covered in seeds. Katniss then forms an alliance with her fellow District 12 tribute, Peeta, and grows close to him. The two eventually make it to the finale of the games, where they become the victors after defying the Capitol's attempt to force one to kill the other.

Throughout the next two novels, Catching Fire and Mockingjay, Katniss becomes a galvanizing symbol of rebellion against the oppressive Capitol. After said rebellion is victorious, Katniss chooses not to execute President Snow; she instead shoots Alma Coin, the corrupt leader of the thought-destroyed District 13, leaving President Snow’s cause of death ambiguous. She later begins a family with Peeta in the now peaceful Panem. To cope with her trauma, she often plays a game in which she thinks about every kind act she has ever witnessed people do, and reflects that “But there are much worse games to play.”

Origins
The idea for the trilogy was based in part on the myth of Theseus and the Minotaur, in which each year seven boys and seven girls from Athens are sent to Crete as tributes to that land to be devoured by the Minotaur, a cycle that continues until Theseus kills the Minotaur. Collins, who heard the story when she was eight years old, was unsettled by its ruthlessness and cruelty. Collins said, "In her own way, Katniss is a futuristic Theseus." Collins also characterized the novels with the fearful sensations she experienced when her father was fighting in the Vietnam War.

In the novels, Katniss is extensively knowledgeable in foraging, wildlife, hunting, and survival techniques. Collins knew some of this background from her father, who grew up in the Great Depression and was forced to hunt to augment a scanty food supply, although Collins saw her father bring home food from the wild during her childhood as well. In addition, Collins researched the subject using a large stack of wilderness survival guidebooks.

Katniss and the other tributes are, in their time before participating in their Hunger Games, compelled to compete for the hearts of sponsors who donate money that can be used to buy vital supplies for them when they are in the arena such as medicine, matches, food, and water. The concept of how the audiences carry nearly as much force as actual characters is based on how, in reality television and in the Roman games, the audience can both "respond with great enthusiasm or play a role in your elimination," as Collins said.

Name
Katniss' first name comes from a plant called Sagittaria, or arrowhead, which is a tuber plant, usually found in water. The root of this plant can be eaten, as Katniss does in the book. Her father once said: "As long as you can find yourself, you'll never starve." Because of the arrow-shaped leaf, this wetlands plant also shares its name with a constellation in the Zodiac called Sagittarius, or "The Archer", which may also reference Katniss' skills in archery.

Her last name comes from Bathsheba Everdene, the central female character in the 1874 novel Far from the Madding Crowd by Thomas Hardy. According to Collins, "The two are very different, but both struggle with knowing their hearts".

In the books

The Hunger Games

The Hunger Games takes place in the ruins of North America: a country called Panem, consisting of the Capitol and 13 subservient districts. During the yearly "Reaping" of tributes for the gladiator-like Hunger Games, Katniss' younger sister, Primrose (Prim) is selected as District 12's female tribute during the yearly public lottery, called the Reaping. Katniss volunteers to take Prim’s place. Because getting chosen at the reaping is supposed to be an honor, the district's Hunger Games escort Effie Trinket asks for a round of applause for Katniss, but everyone remains silent. Instead, everyone in the crowd press their three middle fingers of their left hands against their mouths and hold it out to her as a salute. Katniss describes this as an ancient sign for saying "admiration", "goodbye to someone you love", and "respect".

After Katniss is brought up on stage, Effie chooses the male tribute for the Games. Peeta Mellark is picked, and Katniss remembers something he did to help her when they were just eleven. During the time after Katniss' father died in a mining accident, Katniss' family was slowly starving to death. At this time, Peeta threw her two loaves of bread that he burnt on purpose when he saw her looking for sustenance in the bakery's trashcan. He earned a beating from his mother for this, but he saved Katniss's life. From this point on, she regained hope and strength to keep her family alive. The next day, in the school’s courtyard she saw a dandelion. This reminded her that she could forage along the districts boundary for dandelions. After she looked up, she saw Peeta’s face and could never divide the thought of Peeta and the dandelion that gave her hope. Much time later, she had the courage to venture out into the woods, where she later teamed up with Gale to hunt for food for their families.

When they arrive in the Capitol, Katniss is then met by her prep team, Flavius, Octavia, and Venia, and her stylist Cinna, who prepare Katniss for the Opening Ceremonies. All the tributes wear something that represents their district's industry. Coming from District 12, Katniss and Peeta expect to be dressed in coal mining costumes. Cinna and his partner Portia, however, decide to dress them in a plain black unitard and sleek boots with a cape that burns with fake flames. Katniss and Peeta are initially apprehensive at this arrangement, but their worries bring them closer together. Before the parade, Cinna lights their headdresses and capes and to Katniss and Peeta's surprise (and relief) it doesn't burn. In addition, Cinna suggests they hold hands to present them as "together and a team" and rebellious towards the Capitol. This distinguishes Katniss and Peeta from the rest of the tributes not only because they have most eye-catching costumes, but also that they are warm and relatively friendly to each other in comparison to the other tributes, who have remained cold and stiff with each other. With this new development, both gain the attention (and attraction) of sponsors, and both are unforgettable. From that moment on, Katniss is known as "The Girl On Fire".

As soon as they arrive, Peeta and Katniss are given 3 days of training and coaching with Haymitch and Effie. During the day and afternoon, they are taught survival skills and weapons training in the Training Room with other tributes, while at dinner Haymitch and Effie try and extract information about other tributes from them. During this 3-day training session, they form a small bond with Rue, the 12-year-old female tribute from District 11, and have to appear close to each other on Haymitch's orders. During their private training session, Katniss shoots an arrow at the Gamemakers' food (the target is an apple positioned in the mouth of a whole roasted pig), scoring her an 11 out of 12.

After training ends, there is one day for training on their interview with Caesar Flickerman, the interviewer for all the tributes for 40 years. After a mediocre training session with Effie, she is trained by Haymitch on her personality, getting called a "dead slug". The next day, Cinna tells her just to be honest, which makes her even more memorably awkward. Peeta also helps, admitting he loves Katniss.

During the Games, Katniss allies with Rue after Rue helps Katniss escape the Careers with a tracker jacker nest, getting her a bow in the process. After healing Katniss' wounds from the tracker jacker poison with an apothecary remedy, Rue is killed by Marvel, the male tribute from District 1. Later, the rules are changed so that if the remaining two tributes come from the same district, they will both become victors. Katniss hurries to find Peeta, who is seriously injured from saving Katniss from Cato, the District 2 male, and they resume their "star-crossed lovers" reputation, gaining sympathy from sponsors. While Katniss tries to keep up the ruse she begins to wonder if she does feel something for him; having always focused on surviving, she never considered romance, as the closest person to her was Gale. They outlast the other tributes after Katniss attends the feast to get medicine for Peeta, where she heals him, and the rule change is revoked, meaning there can only be one victor of the Hunger Games. Assuming the Gamemakers would rather have two victors than none, she suggests they both commit suicide by eating poisonous nightlock berries rather than killing each other. The Gamemakers want at least one victor, so Katniss and Peeta are both declared victors of the 74th Hunger Games seconds before the berries hit their mouths. However, she is warned by Haymitch that her actions in the Games may come back to haunt her, while also realizing Peeta's feelings for her are genuine.

Catching Fire
Katniss and Peeta go on the Victory Tour, which is a visit to each district by the winners, strategically placed between each Hunger Games. Katniss becomes aware uprisings are erupting. In addition, the nation's leader, President Snow, is making Katniss convince the nation she is really in love with Peeta and that her suicide pact was an act of love rather than defiance, to quell dissent. Gale has been presented to the nation as her cousin, but President Snow implies his knowledge that Katniss has feelings for him and threatens to have him killed to gain leverage.

To save her family and friends, Katniss agrees to follow the Capitol's agenda. Peeta does the same when he realizes what is at stake. Peeta even proposes marriage to her, and she accepts, but even at that point, President Snow conveys to her that her actions are insufficient. Katniss comes to realize the rebellion in the districts is not within her power to suppress, making it impossible for her to satisfy President Snow's demands. Katniss is also confused as to the nature of her feelings for both Gale and Peeta, both of which are complicated by her fears for the future and her unwillingness to have children who themselves could be subjected to the Hunger Games. When the Quarter Quell—a special Hunger Games that takes place every 25 years and has a special set of rules—is announced, it is proclaimed that all of the current year's tributes will be selected from the pool of previous Hunger Games victors. District 12 has only three living victors: Katniss, Peeta, and Haymitch, who won the 50th Games and successfully mentored Katniss the year before. As Katniss is the only living female victor in District 12, she is the only possible female tribute, and Peeta volunteers to take Haymitch's place when Haymitch is selected. Katniss and Peeta return to the arena, working closely to survive and forming alliances and close friendships in the process, particularly with Finnick Odair, who resuscitated Peeta in the arena. During this time Katniss begins to realize she has feelings for Peeta.

Katniss is taken from the arena and discovers the tributes of many districts, including her ally Finnick Odair, had coordinated an escape plan and used a stolen hovercraft to fly to District 13, which was not destroyed as the Capitol had claimed. However, during the escape, Peeta and Johanna are captured by the Capitol and afterward, Gale informs Katniss District 12 was bombed and destroyed but that her family is safe.

Mockingjay

In Mockingjay, Katniss is rescued and taken to the subterranean civilization of District 13 and meets with the people and their leader, President Alma Coin. She is then taken to see the remains of District 12. She agrees to be the Mocking Jay, the symbol of the rebellion. A love triangle between Katniss, Peeta, and Gale slowly unfolds, forcing Katniss to decide whom she wants to be with—a situation complicated by the fact Peeta is currently being tortured in the Capitol while Gale is at Katniss's side. Katniss also forms a bond of friendship with Finnick, who goes through the same pain she is going through and can understand her situation.

Katniss agrees to be the symbolic leader of their rebellion: "the Mockingjay", the face of the rebels. She discovers Cinna has been killed by the Capitol, but the rest of her prep team survived in District 13's captivity; they prep Katniss for the cameras when she agrees to start doing propaganda pieces for the rebels. Katniss becomes increasingly emotionally unstable by the horrors she witnesses—mass slaughter, the destruction of the only home she has ever known with 90% of the citizens of District 12 dead, many friends killed due to their association with her, and Peeta being beaten on live television. After a rescue mission in which a team from District 13 brings Peeta back, she finds out his memories have been distorted by tracker jacker venom, a mind-control torturing method referred to as "hijacking". He now hates and wants to kill Katniss, believing she is a muttation created by the Capitol. Katniss becomes even more determined to kill Snow after this.

She, along with a group of sharpshooters that include Gale, Finnick, and later Peeta (much to Katniss's dismay) sneak into the Capitol at the cost of several of their own lives in an attempt to kill Snow. Along the way, they encounter sadistic traps created by game makers to make sport of their deaths, and on one occasion, Finnick and Katniss fight off muttations, who start decapitating Finnick, leading Katniss to explode the Holo to allow her friend a quick death. As the remaining team gets close to the presidential mansion, an array of bombs are dropped from a Hovercraft, with only some exploding, killing the refugee Capitol children on whom they were dropped. Rebel medics, including Prim, rush to help the children, but as they arrive the rest of the bombs explode. Prim is killed in front of Katniss, while Katniss's body is severely burned. Although she makes a remarkable physical recovery, Katniss temporarily loses the ability to speak, traumatized by the death of her sister. It is possible Gale was involved in the making of the bombs that killed Prim, although he denies knowing civilians would be attacked.

Meanwhile, President Snow is arrested, found guilty of his crimes against the people of Panem, and sentenced to death. Per Katniss's request, she is designated as his executioner. Before the execution, Snow tells Katniss the bombs weren't his but the rebels' way of gaining sympathy in the Capitol for their cause, making it look like the work of Snow. Although she initially refuses to believe Snow, Katniss realizes the attack method was identical to a trap Gale and fellow Quarter Quell tribute Beetee had designed. Eventually, Katniss realizes someone high up in the ranks of the Rebels would have had to order to have Prim on the front line, despite her age, and comes to suspect Coin ordered the attack on the children to trick the Capitol citizens into thinking the government had killed their children, therefore winning the loyalty of the Capitol's citizens and that Prim was there solely to subdue and unhinge Katniss.

Furthermore, Coin suggests there will be one last Hunger Games where the children from the Capitol will be reaped. She seeks the approval of the surviving victors before making these games official, and Katniss votes yes as a means of gaining Coin's trust. During the supposed execution of Snow, she instead shoots Coin, due to her being responsible for Prim's death. She then attempts to kill herself with the suicide pill attached to her uniform, but Peeta stops her. She is arrested and placed in solitary confinement, where she attempts to commit suicide by starving herself and overdosing. However, she is ultimately released on the grounds she wasn't mentally well at the time of the assassination and is sent back to District 12. Katniss, accompanied by Haymitch, goes back to her home in Victor's Village and is put under care.

Driven into a deep depression, Katniss refuses to leave her house until Peeta (who by then has largely recovered from his brainwashing) returns to District 12 to plant primroses outside, in memory of her sister. Katniss begins to regain her mental health, and she and Peeta deal with their feelings by creating a book composed of information about deceased tributes, friends, and family (eventually Haymitch joins them in this project). Katniss's mother, who chose not to return to District 12 because of all the painful memories of her deceased husband and daughter, decides to work in District 4 as medical personnel. Gale got a "fancy job" in District 2 and is seen regularly on television. Annie, Finnick's wife, has their son. A few hundred District 12 survivors return home and rebuild it, where they no longer mine coal, producing food and manufacturing medicine instead. The novel ends with Katniss admitting she does indeed love Peeta.

Epilogue
In the epilogue, Katniss and Peeta are married and a young daughter and a son. Katniss still suffers nightmares about the game and fears having to eventually relay the story to her children. To soothe her traumatized psyche, Katniss makes lists in her mind of every act of kindness she has ever seen, an obsession that she realizes is simply a "repetitive game" to keep darker thoughts at bay. In the series' last words, Katniss offers one final observation: "But there are much worse games to play."

Characterization

Background
Katniss and her family live in the futuristic nation of Panem, located on the continent once known as North America, which was destroyed in a global catastrophe. Panem is run by an all-powerful city called the Capitol, located in the Rocky Mountains, which is surrounded by 12 districts, each having a specific purpose in supplying something to the Capitol. The story starts in District 12, Katniss's home, the coal-mining district. District 12, in the Appalachian Mountains, is the poorest of the districts, and Katniss lives with her mother and sister in the poorest part of town, known as the Seam.

Katniss's father, a coal miner, was killed in a mine explosion when Katniss was 11. After his death, Katniss's mother went into a deep depression and was unable to take care of her children. On the brink of starvation a few weeks before her twelfth birthday Katniss wandered into the richer part of town, hoping to steal some scraps from the garbage bins of rich merchants. The baker's son, Peeta, whom she did not know, took a beating from his mother for intentionally burning two loaves of bread, knowing that he would be told to throw them out. He was told to give the two loaves of bread to the pig but instead gave them to Katniss. Katniss took them home to her family, who had not eaten in days. The bread gave them hope and kept them motivated, leaving Katniss feeling resentfully indebted to Peeta.

A few days after the incident with the bread, Katniss decided to go into the woods surrounding her district to hunt illegally and gather plants to eat, which was how her father had gotten most of the family's food before he died. There, she met a boy named Gale Hawthorne. Together, they provide for both their families and develop a strong friendship.

Katniss's mother slowly surfaces from her depression and is able to return to her job as an apothecary, and Katniss makes an effort to forgive her. However, despite her mending relationship with her mother, strong friendship with Gale, and the increasingly strong affections she gains for Peeta, Katniss remains adamant that Prim, her younger sister, is "the only person she's certain she loves".

Personality
Collins has described Katniss as being an independent, strong survivalist, lethal, but good at thinking outside the box. Katniss's past hardships (her father's death, mother's depression, and near starvation) have made her a survivor, and she will endure hardship and hard work to preserve her own life and the life of her family. She states nice people are the most dangerous because they get inside of her and they could hurt her badly when she least expected it. She has shown she will protect those she loves, no matter the cost to herself, as shown when she volunteers for the Games to save her little sister Prim, when she shields Gale to keep him from being whipped (even when it means a lash for herself), and when she stoically decides during her second Games to die to save Peeta. Because the majority of her time before the Games was spent keeping herself and her family alive, she does not understand many social cues and is often ignorant of other people's emotions, such as when she doesn't recognize Gale's hints at his growing affection for her, or when she fails to realize that she and Madge Undersee are actually close friends. She has no experience with romance or love other than that of her family and doesn't believe she wants it. She never actually understands Peeta was telling the truth when he declared his love for her in the pre-game interview until after the games itself. She also has large trust issues and does not trust anyone. She plans never to be married nor have children that would grow up subject to the Reaping.

She quickly adapts to the "kill or be killed" philosophy of the games and coldly considers how she will kill her fellow competitors during the first Games, at one point rationalizing she is already a killer due to her hunting experience, though she is briefly disturbed after her first direct kill, Marvel. By the end of the first Games, she is prepared to shoot Cato and attempts to do so only to be interrupted by Peeta being attacked by the mutations. Despite her cold-bloodedness, she is nonetheless extremely relieved at not having to kill her allies Rue and Peeta. As the series progresses, however, she becomes increasingly cold-blooded, to the point where she objectively discusses how to kill everyone (but Peeta) involved in her second Hunger Games in Catching Fire (though she ultimately has to kill only one combatant), and by the third novel is depicted killing an unarmed female civilian during a mission, with apparent remorse.

In Catching Fire, Katniss struggles to understand Panem's political issues as she has had very little education or experience with politics because of her background and lack of interest in it. She also gradually realizes there are more important things than survival and decides she is willing to die for Peeta and the rebellion cause.

Skills
Katniss is a highly skilled archer, hunter, and trapper, having learned these from her father and Gale (Who were both excellent hunters), honed to keep her family from starving. She uses her archery skills during the pre-games judging and receives a score of 11 (out of a possible 12). She has been well educated on edible, medicinal, and the poisonous plant life of District 12. Additionally, she has a singing voice so beautiful the mockingjays, which normally don't listen to anyone, stay quiet to listen, although she has been reluctant to sing since his death (she claims that it's because music is useless for practical survival, but she suspects it's actually because music reminds her too much of him). Katniss is a skilled tree-climber, which has benefited her in hunting and the Games. She is usually very logical, except for times when her emotions get in the way. Peeta mentions that she has an effect on the people around her with the image she projects, and he admires her for it.

Physical appearance
Katniss is described as having "straight black hair, olive skin, and grey eyes", which are typical characteristics of the Seam; the poorest area of District 12. Katniss normally wears her hair in a long braid down her back. She is thin and not very tall, but is strong for her size from hunting to feed her family in the woods outside of District 12. Katniss is sixteen years old during the 74th Hunger Games, and seventeen years old during the Quarter Quell and the Rebellion. She also wears a pin of a Mockingjay during the games to represent good luck.

Critical reception

Katniss has received mostly positive reviews. In a review for The Hunger Games, Stephen King said she was a "cool kid" with a "lame name," before adding, "once I got over [her] name...I got to like her a lot." Francisca Goldsmith in Booklist said, "Although Katniss may be skilled with a bow and arrow and adept at analyzing her opponents' next moves, she has much to learn about personal sentiments, especially her own." Publishers Weekly says, "It's a credit to Collins's skill at characterization that Katniss, like a new Theseus, is cold, calculating and still likable." The Cleveland Plain Dealer stated in a review for Catching Fire that "Katniss in a pensive mood seems out of step with the kick-butt assassin," before adding that her loyalty and kindheartedness were enjoyed. John Green, in the New York Times, called Katniss a "memorably complex and fascinating heroine". Also in The New York Times, Katie Roiphe said that Katniss in Mockingjay was "a great character without being exactly likeable. [She] is bossy, moody, bratty, demanding, prickly", and commented that this is what makes many recent literature heroines likeable. Entertainment Weekly compared Katniss to Bella Swan from the Twilight Saga and said "unlike Twilight's passive, angsty Bella, Katniss is a self-possessed young woman who demonstrates equal parts compassion and fearlessness."

Laura Miller of Salon.com finds Katniss too virtuous and without motivation, negatively contrasting Katniss to Bella of Twilight, saying, "In some ways, Katniss is more passive than Bella, allowed to have all kinds of goodies but only if she demonstrates her virtue by not really wanting them in the first place," and, "For all her irritating flaws, Bella, at least, has the courage of her desire. For what, besides a well-earned vengeance, does Katniss Everdeen truly hunger?" However, Miller did think that she was "in many respects an improvement on...Bella". However, The Daily Telegraph David Gritten labelled her "a great role model for girls" who "has love interests, but doesn't mope passively over boys".

Daniel D'Addario of Time stated: "The Hunger Games heroine has already secured her status as a feminist role model and a box-office powerhouse. But Katniss is more than a movie icon now: Her three-fingered salute, used in Mockingjay as a signal of rebellion against the Capitol, has become a rallying symbol among pro-democracy protesters in Thailand and Hong Kong.

Film adaptation

Actresses Lyndsy Fonseca and Kaya Scodelario expressed interest in the film and received scripts in October 2010, while Oscar-nominated actress Hailee Steinfeld met with director Gary Ross. Chloë Grace Moretz, Malese Jow, and Jodelle Ferland publicly expressed interest in playing Katniss. Director Scott Derrickson, who had met with Lionsgate to potentially direct the film, considered Naya Rivera for the role. Lionsgate confirmed in March 2011 about 30 actresses either met with them or read for the role, including Jennifer Lawrence, Abigail Breslin, Emma Roberts, Saoirse Ronan, Emily Browning, and Shailene Woodley, as well as Steinfeld, Moretz, Fonseca, and Scodelario. On March 16, 2011, it was announced that Jennifer Lawrence of Winter's Bone and X-Men: First Class landed the coveted role of Katniss Everdeen. Lawrence was 20 at the time, a bit older than the character. However, author Suzanne Collins said the actress who plays Katniss has to have "a certain maturity and power" and said she would rather the actress be older than younger. Collins states Lawrence was the "only one who truly captured the character I wrote in the book" and she had "every essential quality necessary to play Katniss."

References

Action film characters
Adventure film characters
Female characters in literature
Female characters in film
Fictional archers
Fictional child soldiers
Fictional professional hunters
Fictional North American people
Fictional revolutionaries
Fictional war veterans
Fictional characters with post-traumatic stress disorder
Fictional women soldiers and warriors
Literary characters introduced in 2008
Science fiction film characters
Teenage characters in film
Teenage characters in literature
The Hunger Games characters
Film characters introduced in 2012